Essert-Romand is a commune in the Haute-Savoie department in the Auvergne-Rhône-Alpes region in south-eastern France. Bordering the winter skiing resort town of Morzine, Essert-Romand is a popular location for holiday homes and ski chalets which are largely unused outside the winter season. There is a small active farming community, farming mainly sheep and goats.

Essert-Romand is found at an altitude of 938m.

See also
Communes of the Haute-Savoie department

References

Communes of Haute-Savoie